Olivier Despax born Olivier Despax de Kerver 28 February 1939 died 10 April 1974 was a French guitarist, singer and film actor.

Biography
The grandnephew of composer Florent Schmitt and the son of Comte Joel de Kerver, Despax began piano lessons at age four and was given a guitar by his parents on his twelfth birthday. He was awarded the Best Jazz Guitarist award in 1955 from the Salon de la Jeunesse du Grand Palais when he was 16 years old.

After military service in the Algerian War he formed a rock group called Olivier Despax and the Gamblers and was signed by Barclay Records.

During a gig at Saint-Tropez, he met Brigitte Bardot who he taught how to play the guitar.  The two appeared together on French television in 1963 singing a duet. The publicity led to a film career in France beginning in 1964 with Mort, où est ta victoire?.  He made his English language debut in Dark of the Sun (1968).

Despax was diagnosed with leukemia in 1969 and died in 1974.

Filmography

References

Bibliography 
 Goble, Alan. The Complete Index to Literary Sources in Film. Walter de Gruyter, 1999.

External links 
 

1939 births
1974 deaths
French male film actors
20th-century French male  singers
Deaths from leukemia